The Farnesina Experimenta Art Collection (Italian: Collezione Farnesina Experimenta) is a contemporary Italian art collection exhibited at the Palazzo della Farnesina, the seat of the Italian Ministry of Foreign Affairs in Rome, Italy.

The collection
The collection was first created to document in an anthological manner the production of the recent generations of artists and the tendencies of contemporary Italian art, in order to support and promote the artistic culture of Italy in the world.

The Farnesina Experimenta augments the collection of contemporary works of art of the Italian Ministry of Foreign Affairs, amplifying the historical Farnesina Collection of Italian art of the 20th century.

The works have been chosen by a scientific committee directed by Maurizio Calvesi and composed of Lorenzo Canova, Marco Meneguzzo and Marisa Vescovo. The works are chosen with the purpose of documenting the different artistic currents present in Italy from the 1990s to 2000.

The works and the artists
The collection, documented by a bilingual catalogue (Italian and English), consists of eighty works by an equal number of artists, according to a principal of anthological representation of the varied and multiform panorama of contemporary Italian art.

The 80 artists  of the Farnesina Experimenta, who come from all over Italy, are: 
 
 Andrea Aquilanti
 Stefano Arienti
 Stefania Aragona
 Matteo Basilè
 Alessandro Bazan
 Angelo Bellobono
 Carlo Benvenuto
 Fausto Bertasa
 Bianco-Valente
 Paola Binante
 Nicola Bolla
 Marco Bolognesi
 Enrica Borghi
 Domenico Borrelli
 Botto & Bruno
 Letizia Cariello
 Francesco Carone
 Gea Casolaro
 Loris Cecchini
 Filippo Centenari
 Francesco Cervelli
 Marco Cingolati
 Marco Colazzo
 Davide Coltro
 Paolo Consorti
 Vittorio Corsini
 Francesco De Grandi
 Fabrice de Nola
 Alberto Di Fabio
 Andrea Di Marco
 Fulvio Di Piazza
 Mauro Di Silvestre
 Stefania Fabrizi
 David Fagioli
 Roberto Falconieri
 Lara Favaretto
 Flavio Favelli
 Emanuela Fiorelli
 Licia Galizia
 Daniele Galliano
 Piero Golia
 Paolo Grassino
 Jonathan Guaitamacchi
 Francesco Impellizzeri
 Laboratorio Saccaridi
 Massimo Livadiotti
 Federico Lombardo
 Raffaele Luongo
 Marcello Maloberti
 Andrea Martinelli
 Simone Martinetto
 Andrea Mastrovito
 Luca Matti
 Sabrina Mezzaqui
 Liliana Moro
 Luigi Mulas Debois
 Adriano Nardi
 Andrea Nicodemo
 Davide Nido
 Giorgio Ortona
 Luca Pancrazzi
 Perino & Vele
 Luca Pignatelli
 Paolo Piscitelli
 Laura Pugno
 Pierluigi Pusole
 Paolo Radi
 Mauro Reggio
 Antonio Riello
 Alessandro Scartabello
 Francesco Sena
 Federico Solmi
 Giuseppe Stampone
 Silvano Tessarollo
 Saverio Todaro
 Sabrina Torelli
 Luisa Valentini
 Nicola Verlato
 Marco Verrelli
 Fabio Viale
 Cesare Viel
 Antonello Viola
 Luca Vitone

The exhibitions
With the aim of promoting and supporting the most promising emerging artistic talents, the Farnesina Experimenta Art Collection was presented to the public on 5 July 2008 at an extraordinary opening of the Ministry of Foreign Affairs, in accordance with the formula Open Doors at the Farnesina.

In order to valorize Italian creativity and make it known internationally, Experimenta will be exhibited in Athens, Istanbul and Moscow during the year 2009, and in Berlin, Beijing, Shanghai, Sydney and São Paulo in 2010.

Bibliography
Maurizio Calvesi, Lorenzo Canova, Marisa Vescovo, Marco Meneguzzo. Collezione Farnesina Experimenta. Rome, Gangemi Editori, 2008. .

See also
Palazzo della Farnesina
Art of Italy
Culture of Italy
Italian Ministry of Foreign Affairs
15th Rome Quadriennale

Notes and references

External links
Farnesina Experimenta Collection on Italian Ministry of Foreign Affairs website

Contemporary art exhibitions
Art exhibitions in Italy
Collections of museums in Italy
Arts in Rome
Italian contemporary art